Denmar is a private psychiatric hospital situated in the east of Pretoria.

History

Denmar was established in 1951 and was the first private psychiatric hospital in Pretoria.  It started as an 18-bed facility.

Facilities

 170 Beds
 Theater and day clinic
 24h admissions
 27 Psychiatrists
 Occupational Therapy
 Clinical Psychologists
 Pharmacy
 Physiotherapist
 Visiting pastors and chaplains
 Arts and Crafts facilities
 Bird trails
 Sport facilities : Volleyball, Jukskei, Croquet, Table tennis, Darts.

External links
Denmar Psychiatric Hospital Official Website

References
Website Denmar Hospital

Hospital buildings completed in 1951
Psychiatric hospitals in South Africa
Buildings and structures in Pretoria
Hospitals in Gauteng
20th-century architecture in South Africa